Thanathip Paengwong is a Thai professional footballer who plays for Khon Kaen United in the Thai League 1 as both left back and midfielder.

He previously played for Osotspa in Thai Premier League.

References
Siamsport
Siamsport Regional League
Sport Guru SMM Online

1991 births
Living people
Thanathip Paengwong
Thanathip Paengwong
Thanathip Paengwong
Thanathip Paengwong
Thanathip Paengwong
Association football defenders
Association football midfielders